Cairrge Brachaidhe, aka Carrickbraghy or Carrichbrack, was a Gaelic-Irish medieval territory located in Inishowen, County Donegal, Ireland.

Overview
Thought to have been named after, or by, Brachaidi mac Diarmata of the Cenél Fergusa (see List of Irish clans in Ulster), a clan who held the territory from the early medieval period. The family of Ó Maol Fábhail were its kings.

In the early modern era it was part of the barony of Inishowen West, in County Donegal.

Cairrge Brachaidhe in the Irish annals
 721: Snedgus Dearg Ua Brachaidhe, was slain in battle on the side of Aedh Allan, son of Fearghal, and the Cinel Eoghain.
 834, Fearghus son of Badhbhchadh, lord of Carraig (Cairge or Cairrge) Brach Aidhe, was slain by the Munstermen.
 857, Seghonnán, son of Conang, lord of Carraig Brachaidhe, died.
 859, Sechonnan filius Conaing, rex Cairgi Brachaide, died.
 878/81, Maelfabhaill, son of Loingseach, lord of Carraig Brachaighe (or Chairrge Brachaighe), died.
 907, Ruarc, mac Maol Fabhaill, tighearna Cairrge Brachaidhe, died.
 965/67, Tigernach mac Ruairc, ri Carce Brachaidhe, died.
 1014, Cú Dubh, mac Maol Fabhaill, toiseach Cairrge Brachaighe was slain by the Síl Taidhg i m-Breghaibh.
 1053, Flaithbhertach Ua Mael Fabhaill, tigherna Cairrcce Brachaidhe, died.
 1065, Muircertach Ua Mael Fhabaill ri Cairce Brachaidhe was slain by the Ui Meithe Menna Tire.
 1082, Gilla Crist Ua Mael Fhabaill ri Cairrce Brachaidhe, died.
 1102, Sitricc Ua Maol Fabhaill tigherna Cairrge Brachaidhe.
 1166, Aedh Ua Mael Fhabhaill, tigherna Cairrcce Brachaidhe, was slain by the son of Néll Uí Lochlainn.
 1198, Cathalan O'Mulfavil, Lord of Carrick-Braghy, was slain by O'Dearan, who was himself slain immediately afterwards in revenge of him.
 1199, Cathalan h-Ua Mael Fhabaill, ri Cairrgi Brachaidhe, was slain by d'O Deran.

External links
 http://www.rootsweb.ancestry.com/~irlkik/ihm/uineill.htm#fergusa

References
 Cenél Conaill and the Donegal Kingdoms, AD 500 – 800, Brian Lacy, Four Courts Press, Dublin, 2006. .

States and territories established in the 7th century
History of County Donegal
Kingdoms of medieval Ireland
Ulster
Geography of County Donegal